People's Vanguard Party is a name used by several political parties:

 People's Vanguard Party (Costa Rica)
 People's Vanguard Party (South Yemen)
 People's Vanguard Party (Venezuela)
 People's Vanguard (Argentine)

See also
 Popular Socialist Vanguard (Chile)
 Popular Revolutionary Vanguard (Brazil)